The 11th Central American and Caribbean Junior Championships was held in Port of Spain, Trinidad and Tobago, between 8–10 July 1994.

Medal summary
Medal winners are published by category: Junior A, Male, Junior A, Female, and Junior B. 
Complete results can be found on the World Junior Athletics History website.

Male Junior A (under 20)

Female Junior A (under 20)

Male Junior B (under 17)

Female Junior B (under 17)

Medal table (unofficial)

Participation (unofficial)

Saint Lucia competed for the first time at the championships. Detailed result lists can be found on the "World Junior Athletics History" website.  An unofficial count yields a number of about 377 athletes (203 junior (under-20) and 174 youth (under-17)) from about 22 countries, a new record number of participating nations:

 (4)
 (37)
 (18)
 (7)
 (3)
 (1)
 (35)
 (21)
 (2)
 (4)
 (5)
 (2)
 (58)
 México (76)
 (2)
 (41)
 (2)
 (3)
 (2)
 (36)
 (1)
 (17)

References

External links
Official CACAC Website
World Junior Athletics History

Central American and Caribbean Junior Championships in Athletics
1994 in Trinidad and Tobago sport
Central American and Caribbean Junior Championships
International athletics competitions hosted by Trinidad and Tobago
1994 in Caribbean sport
1994 in youth sport